Moody's Mood for Love is an album by saxophonist James Moody recorded in 1956 and released on the Argo label.

Reception

Ron Wynn of Allmusic reviewed the album and observed it contains "A strong version of the "Moody's Mood for Love," with a vocal by the late Eddie Jefferson".

Track listing 
All compositions by James Moody, except as indicated
 "Foolin' the Blues" - 5:05     
 "Plus Eight" - 3:56     
 "I'm in the Mood for Love" (Dorothy Fields, Jimmy McHugh) - 3:06     
 "Phil Up" - 2:33     
 "You Go to My Head" (J. Fred Coots, Haven Gillespie) - 3:25     
 "Billie's Bounce" (Charlie Parker) - 3:14     
 "Stardust" (Hoagy Carmichael, Mitchell Parish) - 6:36     
 "Mean to Me" (Fred E. Ahlert, Roy Turk) - 3:03

Personnel 
James Moody - flute tracks 1-7, tenor saxophone track 8
Johnny Coles - trumpet 1,6,7,8
Donald Cole - trombone
Tate Houston - baritone saxophone
Jimmy Boyd - piano, peck horn track 1
Benny Golson - piano track 1
John Latham - bass
Clarence Johnston - drums
Eddie Jefferson - vocals (track 3 and 6)

References 

James Moody (saxophonist) albums
1957 albums
Argo Records albums
Albums produced by Phil Chess